Forest Lake State Park is a  state park in Dalton, New Hampshire. The park is free to use, open year-round, and offers a 200-foot sandy beach on the shore of Forest Lake. Activities in the park include swimming, picnicking, mountain biking, fishing, and boating.

References

External links
Forest Lake State Park New Hampshire Department of Natural and Cultural Resources

State parks of New Hampshire
Parks in Coös County, New Hampshire